Socialist Party may refer to:

 Icelandic Socialist Party
 People's Unity Party – Socialist Party